The second SPAR European Team Championships took place on 19 and 20 June 2010. The track and field athletics tournament run by European Athletics was the successor of the old European Cup competition which was held annually until 2008.
The 2010 Super League was once again won by Russia, with Great Britain second, and Germany finishing in third.

Calendar

Super League

Place: Fana Stadion, Bergen, Norway

Participating countries

Men's events

Women's events

Score table

Final standings

After late doping disqualifications.

Records

First League
Place: Puskàs Ferenc Stadion, Budapest, Hungary

Participating countries

Men's events

Women's events

Score table

Final standings

Records

Second League
Place: Belgrade, Serbia

Participating countries

Men's events

Women's events

Score table

Final standings

Records

Third League
Place: Marsa, Malta

Participating countries

 Athletic Association of Small States of Europe()

Men's events

Women's events

Score table

Final standings

Records

References

External links
 Super League Official Website
 Second League Official Website
 Third League Official Website
 EEA page
 Results

European Athletics Team Championships
European
2010 in European sport